Francis Oliver Green-Wilkinson  (called Oliver; 7 May 191326 August 1970) was an eminent Anglican bishop in the third quarter of the 20th century.

Early life and education
Green-Wilkinson was born on 7 May 1913 in the Rectory at Aston Tirrold, the second of five children of Rev. Lumley Green Wilkinson and Myfanwy, daughter of Sir Francis Edwards, 1st Baronet. His paternal grandfather was Lieutenant-General Frederick Green-Wilkinson.

He was educated at Eton and Magdalen College, Oxford.

Career
On 15 November 1939, Green-Wilkinson joined the Oxfordshire and Buckinghamshire Light Infantry as a private.

Having served with the King's Royal Rifle Corps, he was made deacon at Michaelmas 1946 (22 September) by Edmund Morgan, Bishop of Southampton, and ordained priest on Trinity Sunday 1947 (1 June) by Mervyn Haigh, Bishop of Winchester—both times at Winchester Cathedral. His first post was as a Curate at St Mary, Southampton, after which he was on the staff of St Alban's Cathedral, Pretoria  until his appointment to the episcopate as the 4th Bishop of Northern Rhodesia in 1951. He was consecrated a bishop on St Andrew's Day 1951 (30 November) by Geoffrey Fisher, Archbishop of Canterbury, at Westminster Abbey. After eleven years he was additionally elected Archbishop of Central Africa. A fierce opponent of apartheid and a naturalised Zambian, he was killed in a car crash whilst being driven back the 400 miles from Katete to Lusaka by a very steady African driver who had frequently driven him long distances. As was quite usual, Green-Wilkinson decided to do some work during the journey, and retrieved for his briefcase from the back seat. As he reached for his seat-belt, a tyre burst, the car swerved, Green-Wilkinson was thrown out of the car, and his head hit a tree.

References

Anglican archbishops of Central Africa
Anglican bishops of Northern Rhodesia
Anglican bishops of Lusaka
1913 births
1970 deaths
Recipients of the Military Cross
People educated at Eton College
Alumni of Magdalen College, Oxford
20th-century Anglican archbishops